The 2023 Men's EuroHockey Championship III will be the tenth edition of the Men's EuroHockey Championship III, the third level of the men's European field hockey championships organized by the European Hockey Federation. It will be held from 23 to 29 July 2023 in Skierniewice, Poland.

Qualification
Four teams qualified based on their performance in the 2023 Men's EuroHockey Championship Qualifiers, with the fourth-placed teams qualifiying for the Championship III. The other teams qualified based on their FIH Men's World Ranking

See also
 2023 Men's EuroHockey Championship II
 2023 Women's EuroHockey Championship III

References

EuroHockey Championship III
Men 3
International field hockey competitions hosted by Poland
EuroHockey Championship II
EuroHockey Championship II
Skierniewice
Sport in Łódź Voivodeship